
This is a list of players who graduated from the Nationwide Tour in 2011. The top 25 players on the Nationwide Tour's money list in 2011 earned their PGA Tour card for 2012.

*PGA Tour rookie in 2012

Green background indicates the player retained his PGA Tour card for 2013 through a win or finish in the top 125 of the money list.
Yellow background indicates the player did not retain his PGA Tour card for 2013, but retained conditional status (finished between 126 and 150).
Red background indicates the player did not retain his PGA Tour card for 2013 (finished outside the top 150).

Winners on the PGA Tour in 2012

Runners-up on the PGA Tour in 2012

See also
2011 PGA Tour Qualifying School graduates

External links
The final 25: Who earned their 2012 PGA Tour card
Money list
Player profiles

Korn Ferry Tour
PGA Tour
Nationwide Tour Graduates
Nationwide Tour Graduates